Technological University (Yamethin) is located at Yamethin, Mandalay Region of Myanmar. It was established as the Government Technical Institute (GTI) under the Department of Technological Promotion and Coordination on 11 November 1999. It became Government Technological College (GTC) on 24 April 2009. On 22 April 2010, it developed the Technological University- Yamethin (TU-YMT) under the Ministry of Science and Technology.

Department 
Civil Engineering Department
Electronic and Communication Department
Electrical Power Engineering Department
Mechanical Power Engineering Department
Academic Department

Program 
The university offers Bachelor of Engineering, Bachelor of Technology and A.G.T.I on civil engineering, electronic and communication engineering, electrical power engineering and mechanical engineering.

References 

Technological universities in Myanmar
Universities and colleges in Mandalay Region